Zokhuo, also known as Niuweiba (Cowtail) Phula, is a Loloish language spoken by the Phula people of China. It appears to be the Chökö (Tśökö) of Vietnam.

References

Works cited

 

Loloish languages